Claybourne Elder (born April 21, 1982) is an American actor, singer, and writer who is best known for his work on television and on Broadway.

Biography
Elder is from Springville, Utah. His mother is a schoolteacher and father a carpenter, and he is the youngest of eight siblings. At an early age he played violin in the school orchestra. Elder studied acting at the Moscow Klasse Centre in Russia before attending Brigham Young University and the University of Utah. He earned a degree in dramaturgy and directing from The University of Utah.

Elder received rave reviews and was nominated for a Drama Desk Award for Outstanding Leading Actor in A Play for originating the role of "Ollie Olson" in One Arm directed by Moisés Kaufman. He was nominated for a 2015 Lucille Lortel Award for Outstanding Leading Actor in a Musical for Allegro at Classic Stage. He originated the roles of "Buck Barrow" in Bonnie & Clyde, "Hollis Bessemer" in Stephen Sondheim's Road Show and "Michael Victor" in Venice.

He played the Soldier/Alex and understudied Jake Gyllenhaal in the Broadway revival of Sunday in the Park with George, which opened in February 2017. He also played the soldier in the concert performances in October 2016 at New York City Center. He can be heard on the cast recordings of Bonnie & Clyde, Road Show, Venice and Sunday in the Park with George.

Elder guest-starred as Pete O'Malley in the second season of The CW's The Carrie Diaries.

Regionally, Elder played George in Sunday in the Park with George at the Signature Theatre, Arlington, Virginia, in 2014.

On Broadway, Elder played the role of Andy in the 2021 revival of Stephen Sondheim's musical Company.

Filmography

Personal life
Elder and director Eric Rosen were married on July 28, 2012 in New York State. In 2017 they had a son through surrogacy.

In 2022, many news outlets reported a human interest story about Elder. In 2007, as a 23-year-old aspiring actor visiting New York City, he was in the standing-room section of the Broadway musical The 25th Annual Putnam County Spelling Bee when a stranger approached him, noted his obvious enthusiasm for theater, gave him $200, and told him to spend it the next night on a ticket to a revival of Stephen Sondheim's Sweeney Todd: The Demon Barber of Fleet Street. Elder did see that show and considered it—and the stranger's kindness—to be the factors that helped him decide to move to New York and pursue acting. By 2022 Elder was starring on Broadway in a different Sondheim revival, Company, alongside Patti LuPone, one of the stars of the Sweeney Todd production that so affected the course of Elder's career; at the same time, Elder was also starring in the HBO series The Gilded Age with Michael Cerveris, who had played the title role in that Sweeney Todd revival. Elder was reunited with Mark Howell, the stranger who had given him the money, and "paid forward" the favor by buying strangers tickets to Company. In July 2022, Elder retold this story on an episode of the WBEZ radio program This American Life that examined acts of kindness from strangers.

References

External links

1982 births
Living people
21st-century American male actors
20th-century American LGBT people
21st-century American LGBT people
American gay actors
American male singers
American male musical theatre actors
American male television actors
American gay musicians
LGBT people from Utah
Male actors from Utah
People from Springville, Utah